Thomas Beauchamp may refer to:
 Thomas Beauchamp, 11th Earl of Warwick (1313–1369), English nobleman and military commander 
 Thomas Beauchamp, 12th Earl of Warwick (1338–1401), English nobleman

See also
 Tom Beauchamp (born 1939), American philosopher